The 44th Arizona State Legislature, consisting of the Arizona State Senate and the Arizona House of Representatives, was constituted in Phoenix from January 1, 1999, to December 31, 2000, during the first two years of Jane Dee Hull's first full term in office. Both the Senate and the House membership remained constant at 30 and 60, respectively. The Republicans lost two seats in the Senate, but still held a 16-14 majority. The Republicans gained two seats in the House, maintaining their majority in the lower chamber, 40–20.

Sessions
The Legislature met for two regular sessions at the State Capitol in Phoenix. The first opened on January 11, 1999, and adjourned on May 7, while the Second Regular Session convened on January 10, 2000, and adjourned sine die on April 18.

There were seven Special Sessions, the first of which was convened on March 31, 1999, and adjourned on April 7; the second convened on June 22, 1999, and adjourned sine die on the same day; the third convened on December 13, 1999, and adjourned sine die December 14; the fourth convened on February 14, 2000, and adjourned sine die on February 17; the fifth convened on June 6, 2000, and adjourned sine die June 28; the sixth special session convened and adjourned on October 20, 2000; and the final special session, the seventh, convened on November 13, 2000, and adjourned sine die on 
December 4.

State Senate

Members

The asterisk (*) denotes members of the previous Legislature who continued in office as members of this Legislature.

House of Representatives

Members 
The asterisk (*) denotes members of the previous Legislature who continued in office as members of this Legislature.

References

Arizona legislative sessions
1999 in Arizona
2000 in Arizona
1999 U.S. legislative sessions
2000 U.S. legislative sessions